Anahita Nemati (born July 11, 1977) also known as Ana Nemati is an Iranian actress and model.
She began acting in 1996. She first appeared on screen in a movie called Hiva and after that in a TV serial called Mosafer. She is also an experienced and talented dress designer.

Filmography 

 Aal
 Payane Dovom
 The Swallows in Love
 Ice age
 Yeki Az Ma Do Nafar
 Penhan
 Yeki Mikhad Bahat Harf Bezaneh
 Hadafe Asli
 Zane Dovom
 Six and Five
 Dar Emtedade Shahr
 Barf Rooye Shirvanie Dagh Barkhord Kheyli Nazdik Hiva
 Soghate Farang''
 Da'vat
 Immortality

Awards 

 Fajr Film's award because of acting in "Aal" movie

References
 Anahita Album www.aksdownload.com

External links
 www.annahitanemati.com
 www.1ana-nemati.blogfa.com

Living people
1977 births
People from Shahrud, Iran
People from Tehran
Iranian film actresses
Iranian stage actresses
Iranian television actresses
20th-century Iranian actresses
21st-century Iranian actresses